Kanthadai Vaidya Subrahmanya Aiyar (1875 – 7 November 1969) was a Tamil epigraphist and historian. He is considered to be the first person to conclusively decipher the cave inscriptions of Tamil Nadu as a form of Tamil-Brahmi.

Early life 

Subrahmanya Aiyar was born in Coimbatore in 1875 and was educated in Trichinopoly. On completion of his education, Aiyar obtained a job at the Coimbatore Collectorate in Ootacamund where his abilities were recognised by Chief Epigraphist V. Venkayya who in 1906, inducted him into his team.

Career 

Subrahmanya Aiyar worked as a government epigraphist from 1906 to 1932. He edited South Indian Inscriptions Volumes VI, VII and VIII and wrote for the Epigraphia Indica. In 1938, he published a monumental 3-volume work Historical Sketches of Ancient Deccan.

Works

Notes

References 

 
 

1875 births
1969 deaths
People from Coimbatore
19th-century Indian historians
20th-century Indian historians
Scientists from Tamil Nadu
Indian epigraphers
Historians in British India